Juul Franssen (born 18 January 1990) is a Dutch judoka.

She participated at the 2018 World Judo Championships, winning a bronze medal.

In 2020, she won one of the bronze medals in the women's 63 kg event at the 2020 European Judo Championships held in Prague, Czech Republic.

References

External links
 
 

1990 births
Living people
Dutch female judoka
Sportspeople from Venlo
European Games competitors for the Netherlands
Judoka at the 2015 European Games
Judoka at the 2019 European Games
Judoka at the 2020 Summer Olympics
Olympic judoka of the Netherlands
21st-century Dutch women